John Holden Warren (August 23, 1825August 1, 1901) was an American medical doctor, Republican politician, and Wisconsin pioneer.  He served two years in the Wisconsin State Senate representing Green County.  In historical documents, his middle name is sometimes spelled "Halden".

Biography
John Holden Warren was born in Hogansburg, Franklin County, New York, in August 1825.  He attended the common schools in that community until age 13, when he went west to the Wisconsin Territory.  He first came to Janesville, Wisconsin, when there were just two families residing there, and he attended the first school taught at that settlement.  He went on to study the medical profession under Dr. Samuel Nichols in Janesville.  He then went to Chicago to further his studies under Dr. Charles V. Dyer, and subsequently attended Rush Medical College in Chicago, graduating in 1849.  

He initially established a medical practice at Lodi, in Columbia County, Wisconsin, but, at the request of his brother, abandoned his medical practice in 1851 to come to Albany, Wisconsin, in Green County, to work in the milling and mercantile business until 1870. 

Politically, Warren identified with the Whig Party and joined many other northern Whigs in the new Republican Party when it was established.  On the Republican Party ticket, Warren was elected to the Wisconsin State Senate from Green County in 1857, serving in the 11th and 12th Wisconsin legislatures.  After leaving office, he served as chief clerk of the Senate for the next three terms.

In 1862, he was collector of internal revenue at Albany by President Abraham Lincoln, and held that office for seven years.  He owned a carriage service and was a major mail contractor, operating over one hundred mail routes.

Around 1885, he began to suffer from dementia and was sent to the sanitarium at Palmyra, Wisconsin.  He died there in August 1901.

Personal life and family
John Holden Warren was a descendant of the New England Warrens.  His father fought in the War of 1812 and his grandfather fought in the American Revolutionary War.

John Holden Warren married Mary Louise Nichols, the daughter of his first medical instructor, Dr. Samuel Nichols.  They had at least seven children together.

Both of Warren's sons became doctors.  Benjamin Warren at Three Oaks, Michigan, and Herbert Warren at New York City.  His daughter Gertrude managed a hotel in Biloxi, Mississippi.

References

External links
 

1825 births
1901 deaths
People from Franklin County, New York
People from Janesville, Wisconsin
People from Green County, Wisconsin
People from Palmyra, Wisconsin
Rush Medical College alumni
Wisconsin Whigs
Wisconsin Republicans
19th-century American politicians
Physicians from Wisconsin
Wisconsin state senators
Wisconsin postmasters